The Thematic House (presently known as the Cosmic House) is a house at 19 Lansdowne Walk in Holland Park, Kensington, London. 

It has been listed Grade I on the National Heritage List for England since May 2018. It was designed by Charles Jencks in collaboration with other postmodern architects including Terry Farrell and Michael Graves, as his own home. The sculptors Celia Scott and Eduardo Paolozzi also participated in its development.  

The existing 1840s end-of-terrace villa was initially purchased by Jencks and his wife Maggie Keswick in May 1978, and the transformation of the main structure was completed in 1983.  The stucco-fronted building houses such interior features as pedimented bookshelves, a sundial window seat, and an upside-down classical dome serving as a jacuzzi. The main Solar Stair is complemented by a semi-circular 'Moonwell', which channels natural light over a darker area. The house encapsulates Jencks's theories, and there are plans for it to be converted into an archive museum, named the 'Cosmic House', which could be open to the public by appointment.

It opened to the public from 24 September 2021, as "The Cosmic House".

References

External links 
 
 Photographs of Thematic House at museandmaker.com

Grade I listed buildings in the Royal Borough of Kensington and Chelsea
Postmodern architecture in the United Kingdom
Grade I listed houses in London
Houses in Holland Park